The Chaun is a stream in Far East Siberia. It flows roughly northwards, passing through the sparsely populated areas of the Siberian tundra.

Course
The Chaun originates in rivers flowing from the Ilirney Range and the northwestern edge of the crater of Lake Elgygytgyn (Maly Chaun). The river Palyavaam discharges into a right distributary of the Chaun.

Its most important tributaries are the Ugatkyn from the left side and the Milguveyem from its right side. The Chaun river gives the Chaun Bay its name. The Chaun and its tributaries belong to the Chukotka Autonomous Okrug administrative region of Russia.

See also
List of rivers of Russia

References

External links 
 Cultural data
  

Rivers of Chukotka Autonomous Okrug
Drainage basins of the East Siberian Sea